Ayuriq (also Romanized as Ayūrīq, Īvrīq, and Yūrīq) is a village in Fuladlui Shomali Rural District, Hir District, Ardabil County, Ardabil Province, Iran. At the 2006 census, its population was 1,463, in 309 families.

References 

Towns and villages in Ardabil County